Henry A. Dubois and Evanlina House is a historic home located at Hudson in Columbia County, New York.  It was built about 1840 and is a -story, wood-frame dwelling with a stone and brick foundation and hipped roof in the Greek Revival style.  The front facade features a 1-story, three-bay open central porch with four Ionic order columns and a deep entablature. A Victorian wood cupola was added to the roof about 1870. Also on the property is an "L" shaped wood frame barn dated to the 1860s.

It was added to the National Register of Historic Places in 2004.

References

Houses on the National Register of Historic Places in New York (state)
Greek Revival houses in New York (state)
Houses completed in 1840
Houses in Columbia County, New York
National Register of Historic Places in Columbia County, New York